Voltage-gated potassium channel subunit beta-2 is a protein that in humans is encoded by the KCNAB2 gene.

Function 

Voltage-gated potassium (Kv) channels represent the most complex class of voltage-gated ion channels from both functional and structural standpoints. Their diverse functions include regulating neurotransmitter release, heart rate, insulin secretion, neuronal excitability, epithelial electrolyte transport, smooth muscle contraction, and cell volume. Four sequence-related potassium channel genes - shaker, shaw, shab, and shal - have been identified in Drosophila, and each has been shown to have human homolog(s). This gene encodes a member of the potassium channel, voltage-gated, shaker-related subfamily. This member is one of the beta subunits, which are auxiliary proteins associating with functional Kv-alpha subunits. This member alters functional properties of the KCNA4 gene product. Alternative splicing of this gene results in two transcript variants encoding distinct isoforms.

In melanocytic cells KCNAB2 gene expression may be regulated by MITF.

Interactions 

KCNAB2 has been shown to interact with KCNA2.

See also 
 Voltage-gated potassium channel

References

Further reading

External links 
 

Ion channels